Penn Laird is an unincorporated community in Rockingham County, Virginia, United States.

Geography 

History 
Penn Laird has a post office with ZIP code 22846, which opened on July 18, 1896. 
Ruth Kathleen Funkhouser Armstrong states the name Penn Laird came from the two middle names of Harold Roudabush's father, William Penn Roudabush and Harold's Wife father, whose middle name was Laird.

References

Unincorporated communities in Rockingham County, Virginia
Unincorporated communities in Virginia